The 2017–18 season is Everton Ladies Football Club's first season returning to the FA Women's Super League since the 2014 season, having been promoted after winning the WSL2 Spring Series, and being one of the league's foundation clubs.

Following a reorganisation of top-level women's football in England, the 2017 season will only cover half of a traditional season's length, while the FA WSL shifts its calendar to match the traditional autumn-to-spring axis of football in Europe. For the same reason, there is no Champions League qualification nor relegation for which to be competed.

First team

New contracts

Transfers

In

Out

Competitions

Women's Super League

League table

Results summary

Results by matchday

Matches

FA Cup

WSL Cup

Group stage

Knock-out Rounds

Statistics

Players without any appearance are not included.

|-
|colspan="14"|Goalkeepers:
|-

|-
|colspan="14"|Defenders:
|-

|-
|colspan="14"|Midfielders:
|-

|-
|colspan="14"|Forwards:
|-

Honours
 FA WSL Player of the Month - November: FW Courtney Sweetman-Kirk

References

Everton F.C. (women) seasons
Everton